Gemopatrilat (INN) is an experimental drug that was never marketed.  It acts as a vasopeptidase inhibitor. It inhibits both angiotensin-converting enzyme (ACE) and neutral endopeptidase (neprilysin).

References 

ACE inhibitors
Acetic acids
Azepanes
Carboxamides
Lactams
Thiols
Abandoned drugs